"Confession" is an American television play broadcast on November 29, 1956, as part of the CBS television series, Playhouse 90.  It was the ninth episode of the first season of Playhouse 90.

Plot
A reporter, Ben Birch, is assigned to write about the life a recently-deceased civic leader. He ends up uncovering a major public fraud perpetrated by the deceased man and wins the hand of the man's daughter, Amy Mathewson.

Cast
The cast of Confession included the following:
 Dennis O'Keefe as Ben Birch
 June Lockhart as Amy Mathewson
 Paul Stewart as Martin Hoeffer
 Romney Brent as Toby Mathewson
 Henry Daniell as Hubbel
 Ivan Triesault as Carl Kersch
 Charles Watts as Emerson Fricke
 John Crawford as Gunman
  Chet Stratton as Bergstrom
 Jason Johnson as Watchman

Robert Preston hosted the broadcast.

Production
The film was produced by Screen Gems. It was the second film that Screen Gems made for Playhouse 90 (the first being The Country Husband).

Eva Wolas was the producer and Anton M. Leader the director. Devery Freeman wrote the script. Gert Andersen was the director of photography and Henry Batista the editor.

The film was broadcast on Thursday, November 29, 1956, from 9:30 p.m. to 11 p.m.

Reception
In The New York Times, Richard F. Shepard wrote that it "displayed activity enough to avoid being characterized as a familiar complete bore. But it surely was familiar."

References

1956 American television episodes
Playhouse 90 (season 1) episodes
1956 television plays